Alberta Provincial Highway No. 560, commonly referred to as Highway 560 or Glenmore Trail, is a highway in the province of Alberta, Canada. It runs west–east from the east Calgary boundary at 84 Street SE (Range Road 290), north along the city boundary to Range Road 284, across Highway 791 south of Chestermere to the southern terminus of the northern section of Highway 797, Centre Street in Langdon.

It is named Glenmore Trail within Calgary city limits.  Highway 560 extends to the west in an interchange with the freeways of Hwy 2 and Highway 8.  It extends to the east as Township Road 234 to Highway 24, and Highway 817.

Major intersections 
Starting from the west end of Highway 560:

See also 

Transportation in Calgary

References 

Roads in Calgary
560